Dressing Table is a 2016 Bangladeshi drama film written and directed by Abu Sayeed. The film stars Tarin Rahman and Azad Abul Kalam in the lead roles.

Plot
Shila and Rahul have been married recently. Being a lower-middle-class family, they could not get all the things needed to furnish a house. There is no dressing table in the house. One day Rahul brings an old dressing table. Albeit an old one, Shila is still happy with it. Next day while cleaning the dressing table she finds an old diary. At first Shaila hesitates about whether she should read the diary as it belongs to someone else, but one night she gives in to her curiosity. After finding the first 2/3 pages interesting, she ends up reading the whole diary by the end of the night. After finishing the diary, Shila walks towards the dressing table. She looks at the mirror and discovers herself. Then starts a new chapter in her life.

Cast
 Tarin Rahman as Shila
 Azad Abul Kalam as Rahul
 Taskin Sumi
 Arman Parvez Murad
 Nadia Nodi
 Iffat Trisha
 Tania Rahman
 Ataur Rahman
 KS Firoz
 Khalilur Rahman Qaderi

Production and release
Filming began on 24 July 2015, took place in Dhaka and Purbali, and lasted 10 days. The film was submitted to the Bangladesh Film Censor Board on 4 August 2016, and cleared on 22 August.

Dressing Table received its world première at the 40th Montreal World Film Festival on 26 August 2016.

Response
Film critic Swapan Mullick of The Statesman wrote, "The simplicity is quite deceptive and the acting far removed from the dramatic compulsions of popular cinema."

References

2016 films
Bengali-language Bangladeshi films
Films directed by Abu Sayeed (film director)
2010s Bengali-language films